Afrasura terlinea is a moth of the  subfamily Arctiinae which is endemic to Ethiopia.

References

External links

Moths described in 2009
Endemic fauna of Ethiopia
terlinea
Insects of Ethiopia
Moths of Africa